La Valle dell'odio is a 1950 Italian drama film directed by  Adriano Zancanella.

Cast
 Antonio Strobl 
 Ottavio Fedrizzi 
 Ilse Gray

External links
 

1950 films
1950s Italian-language films
Italian black-and-white films
1950s Italian films